Those marked in bold have later been capped at full International level.

Group A

Head coach:

Head coach:

Head coach:Andrzej Zamilski

Head coach:

Group B

Head coach:

Head coach:

Head coach: Juan Santisteban

Head coach:

Group C

Head coach:

Head coach:

Head coach:

Head coach:

Group D

Head coach:Christian Damiano

Head coach: Sergio Vatta

Head coach: Rui Caçador

Head coach:

Footnotes

UEFA European Under-17 Championship squads